is a Japanese actor and singer formally affiliated with Fortune Entertainment. He was the oldest member of the boy group Boys and Men, designated by his color yellow-green. He is best known for his role as the character, Kaito Kumon/Kamen Rider Baron, from the Kamen Rider series Kamen Rider Gaim.

Early life
Kobayashi was born in Shiga Prefecture, Japan. While getting the confectionery health nurse license in confectionery of vocational school after graduating from high school, he worked as a pastry chef in Shiga and Tokyo. With the aim of the entertainment industry into an opportunity that it has submitted the recommendation of a friend in Junon Super Boy Contest, he started entertainment activities from November 2009 to belong to the Thani promotion. While after the debut, Kobayashi had parallel work and entertainment activities of making cake.

Career 
In June 2010, he participated in the predecessor project Ikemen☆Nagoya of Boys and Men. Kobayashi was not a from Tōkai, but the residents were along the concept of the project, he was participated in the audition by the intention of the agency, he became an established member of Boys and Men.

In 2011, his introduction performed was the role of Mizuki in The Prince of  Tennis Musical 2nd Season. For practice and performances appearance of the same work, Kobayashi was temporary suspended the activities of Boys and Men. He returned to the unit activity, he had also appeared in the stage outside.

In February 2012, Kobayashi's CD debut as a member of the internal unit YanKee5 of Boys and Men. In November of the same year, his first solo debut  was the single "Boku no sekai ga kawatte iku / seven colors ☆ love".

In 2013, Kobayashi's first regular appearances in a television drama was Kamen Rider Gaim. He served as the rival Kaito Kumon / Rider Baron.

In the end of July 2014, Kobayashi made recipes at the community site Cookpad, and start posting of cuisine under the heading of Yutaka Kobayashi's kitchen. In November of the same year, his recipe is the subject of announcing the single "Love Suites recipe" series where Setona Mizushiro worked on lyrics.

In 2014, Kobayashi won at second place in the popular vote of Boys and Men. In the same year, his first starring role in a television drama was Naze Todo-in Seiya 16-sai wa kanojo ga dekinai no ka?

In October 2021, Kobayashi was caught shoplifting ¥9,000 of cosmetics. Due to this, on April 8, 2022,  Fortune Entertainment announced his departure from the company and idol group BOYS AND MEN.

Filmography

TV series

Films

References

External links
 Official profile at NDP
 The Love Suites Recipes official websites
 Yutaka Kobayashi's Kitchen (Cookpad)
 Yutaka Kobayashi (actor)

1989 births
Japanese male actors
Kamen Rider
Living people
People from Shiga Prefecture